The British College of Osteopathic Medicine (also known as BCOM) is an educational organisation based in London. It was one of the first colleges to offer degree-level and master's-level study in osteopathy. The College's Principal is Dr. Kerstin Rolfe.

History 
The College was founded as the British College of Naturopathy and Osteopathy (BCNO) in 1936. Its original site was bombed in 1942 during World War II and the naturopathic pioneer, Stanley Lief, founder of Champneys Spa, donated a house in London’s Hampstead as a new campus.  This building, which is now named Frazer House and is Grade II-listed, is still the core of the BCOM campus. The college was renamed to the British College of Osteopathic Medicine in 2002.

Courses 
BCOM currently provides the following degree pathways:

Masters in Osteopathy 
This pathway also includes a Diploma in Osteopathy, which offers eligibility to register with the General Osteopathic Council.  A four-year integrated masters, allowing direct entry for undergraduates which takes them to a Masters in Osteopathy and eligibility to professionally register in the UK. This course attracts public funding for eligible students for all four years.

BSc (Hons) Osteopathy for Diplomates (Conversion Course) 
This degree is a conversion-to-degree course for already-registered Osteopaths.

The first two courses also include a Diploma in Naturopathy.

A BCOM graduate will normally be eligible for registration with both the General Osteopathic Council.

BCOM also supports MPhil/Ph.D. study.

Clinics 

BCOM operates an outpatient teaching clinic from its Frazer House site in Netherhall Gardens, Hampstead.  The Clinic is served by both clinical students under either direct (pre-registration) or on-call (post-registration) supervision from experienced and registered osteopaths with a wide range of experience.  Clinical experiential learning is a fundamental of osteopathic education.

Frazer Clinic has 24 treatment rooms, a full clinic reception and a dedicated IT and seminar suite.  Well established in the local community around BCOM’s Frazer House campus in Hampstead, Frazer Clinic is used for most of the clinical training undertaken by undergraduate students.  Lief Clinic, also on campus, at the Lief House site, was inaugurated in 2004 as a research clinic.  The Lief Clinic is normally staffed by postgraduate students and BCOM faculty members engaged in research.

Before registering, UK osteopathy students take a Clinical Competence assessment.  BCOM students have regularly achieved a 100% pass rate at first attempt, which is held to be best practice in the UK Osteopathic sector.

References

External links
BCOM website
BCOM teaching clinic website
The Guardian
The Independent

Educational institutions established in 1936
1936 establishments in the United Kingdom
Universities and colleges in London
Osteopathic colleges in the United Kingdom